Matthew "Matt" Matros (born May 13, 1977) is a professional poker player and author from Brooklyn, New York, who has won three World Series of Poker events.

Matros holds a Bachelor of Science degree from Yale University and a Master of Fine Arts degree from Sarah Lawrence College. He is the author of the book The Making Of A Poker Player: How An Ivy League Math Geek Learned To Play Championship Poker, and was a poker coach on the now defunct poker site, CardRunners.

Live poker
Matros won his first bracelet at the 2010 World Series of Poker Event 12: $1,500 Limit Hold’em earning $189,870.
He has three other WSOP final tables, finishing 9th at the 2005 WSOP $3,000 Limit Hold'em event, 6th at the 2008 WSOP $1,500 No Limit Hold'em event, and 9th at the 2010 $2,000 Limit Hold 'Em event.
All together, Matros has 28 WSOP cashes.

He finished in third place behind the runner up Hasan Habib and winner Martin De Knijff in 2004 at the $25,000 World Poker Tour (WPT) Championship,  earning him $706,903. Matros finished 22nd at the 2006 (WPT) Pokerstars.com Caribbean Adventure, and just missed the 6 handed Final Table of the WPT 2008 North American Poker Championship, where he finished 7th.

At the 2012 World Series of Poker, Matros won his third WSOP bracelet in the $1,500 No Limit Hold'em Six-Handed event, earning $454,835.

As of 2012, his total live tournament winnings exceed $2,300,000.

World Series of Poker bracelets

Notes

External links
Home Page
WPT profile

Living people
World Series of Poker bracelet winners
American poker players
1977 births